The 1991 New Zealand tour rugby to Australia  was the 27th tour by the New Zealand national rugby union team to Australia.

It was a short tour with two matches. In the same year the Bledisloe Cup was contested in a home/away format. One match was held in each country, and a preliminary match in each. 

The All Blacks lost the Sydney test match, but won the return test match later in the month, during the subsequent Australian tour of New Zealand to retain the Bledisloe Cup.

The tour 
Scores and results list New Zealand's points tally first.

External links 
 New Zealand in Australia 1991 from rugbymuseum.co.nz

New Zealand
New Zealand tour
Australia tour
New Zealand national rugby union team tours of Australia